The Wetteraukreis is a Kreis (district) in the middle of Hesse, Germany. Neighbouring districts are Landkreis Gießen, Vogelsbergkreis, Main-Kinzig-Kreis, district-free Stadt Frankfurt, Hochtaunuskreis and Lahn-Dill-Kreis.

History
The district was created in 1972 when the two districts Friedberg and Büdingen were merged.

Geography

The district is located between the Taunus mountains and the Vogelsberg volcanic mountain. The main rivers of the district are the Nidda River and the Wetter River.

Coat of arms
The imperial eagle in the top of the coat of arms was chosen because the Wetterau was imperial possession in the past. The bars in the bottom derive from the lords of Isenburg-Büdingen, who owned most of the area. The wavy line depicts the river Wetter which flows through the capital Friedberg.

Towns and municipalities

References

External links

 Official website 

 
Districts of Hesse